Crucero de placer is a 1980 Argentine comedy-drama film.

External links 
 

1980 films
Argentine comedy-drama films
1980s Spanish-language films
1980s Argentine films